Agência Pública is a Brazilian investigative and independent journalism agency. It was founded in 2011 by the reporters Marina Amaral, Natália Viana and Tatiana Merlino. It is currently run by Marina Amaral and Natália Viana.

Agência Pública has received multiple awards for having produced excellent reports on subjects of public interest with the objectives of strengthening the right to information, helping to qualify the democratic debate, and promoting human rights.

The agency distributes its content free of charge, including to other sites and platforms to republish their reports, under the Creative Commons Attribution NonDerivative license.

Projects

Support for independent journalism

In addition to its own reports, Pública distributes grants to: independent reporters to develop their stories, incubate journalism initiatives and launch the Independent Journalism Map in 2016.

The Agência Pública office is located in São Paulo and, since 2016, the organization has run the Casa Pública, the first Cultural Center of Journalism in Brazil.

Truco
Since 2014, the Agência Pública maintains a fact-checking project, Truco. The project is dedicated to checking the rhetoric of politicians and personalities when they make relevant statements that lead to debates about the society. Truco checked the 2014 presidential elections and the 2016 municipal elections. It is one of fact checking projects which has the facts verification mark from Google.

Funding
Pública is funded by various foundations, such as the Ford Foundation, Betty and Jacob Lafer Foundation, the Open Society Foundations, the Oak Foundation, and when required, resorts to crowdfunding to fund reporting.

Awards

Pública was the third most awarded Brazilian communication vehicle in 2016, a first of its kind feat for an independent publication according to the site "Mais Premiados." In that same year, its director, Natália Viana was the most awarded reporter, for the rewards Comunique-se of Written Media Reporter, Gabriel Garcia Marquez in the category Text  and Vladmir Herzog in the category Internet by special "100".

It was the first  Brazilian media vehicle nominated to Freedom of the Press Award from Reporters Without Borders.

2016 
 Vladimir Herzog Award
 Prêmio Gabriel Garcia Marquez
 Prêmio Comunique-se
 Prêmio José Lutzenberger de Jornalismo Ambiental
 Troféu Mulher Imprensa
 Prêmio Délio Rocha
 Prêmio Petrobrás de Jornalismo
 Prêmio República
 Prêmio Direitos Humanos de Jornalismo

2015 
 Prêmio Tim Lopes
 Prêmio Petrobrás de Jornalismo
 Prêmio Roche de Jornalismo em Saúde
 Online Journalism Awards
 Prêmio Direitos Humanos de Jornalismo

2014 
 Prêmio SindhRio de Jornalismo e Saúde
 Prêmio MPT de Jornalismo
 Prêmio Direitos Humanos de Jornalismo

2013 
 Prêmio HSBC – Jornalistas & Cia
 Troféu Mulher Imprensa

2012 
 Prêmio HSBC – Jornalistas & Cia de Jornalismo Ambiental
 Prêmio Allianz Seguros de Jornalismo Ambiental
 Prêmio Direitos Humanos de Jornalismo

References

External links 
 Official site

News agencies based in Brazil
Investigative journalism
Brazilian journalism